Lawrence F. Vargo. Jr. (born April 5, 1939) is a former American football player.  He played for the University of Detroit Titans football team from 1959 to 1961. In 1961, he caught 32 passes for 601 yards; he led the NCAA major colleges with eight receiving touchdowns.  He played professional football for the Detroit Lions in 1962 and 1963 and, after a trade in September 1964, for the Minnesota Vikings from 1964 to 1966. He was principally a defensive player in the NFL, intercepting six passes and recovering three fumbles.

See also
 List of NCAA major college football yearly receiving leaders

References

1939 births
American football ends
American football linebackers
American football defensive backs
Detroit Titans football players
Detroit Lions players
Living people
Minnesota Vikings players
New York Giants players
Players of American football from Michigan
People from Iron Mountain, Michigan